La Nouaye is a commune in the department of Ille-et-Vilaine  in Brittany in the northwest of France.

Population
Inhabitants of La Nouaye are called Lanoysiens in French.

Geography
The commune of La Nouaye is part of Montfort-sur-Meu county. It comes under the control of Rennes. It is surrounded by Montfort-sur-Meu, Bédée, Iffendic, Breteil, Pleumeleuc, Talensac, Saint-Gonlay.
It stretches over 272 hectares and it is mostly made of agricultural land.
Two brooks cross the village, one demarcating Iffendic and La Nouaye, the other crossing the town in the North of its territory.

History
La Nouaye is an old parish, probably dating from the 9th century. It was written Lanoas in 1189, Lamnoê in 1516, La Nouais in the 18th century and Lanouaye in 1872. 
The parish of La Nouaye, enclaved in the diocese of Saint-Malo,  was part of the deanery of Bobital, coming under the diocese of Dol and which was under the term of Saint Etienne.
During the year II of the Republic, we could count 201 inhabitants like in 1982.

Tourism
Tourism management in Montfort-sur-Meu" is entrusted by Montfort Community to the Tourist Office of the district of Montfort.

Buildings and touristic places

Buildings
Saint Hubert church and wayside cross
The church, built at the end of the 15th century, is one of the most beautiful of the district of Montfort, thanks to the porch and the wayside cross. This last is located in the churchyard adjoining the church Saint Hubert. The porch allowed the sick and the leprous to attend the service, hence its name "the leprous porch". The relics of the wayside cross are classified Historical Monument.

The leper hospital
It was located at the place name "la ville es malades" and was burnt in 1591.

Touristic places
Le Circuit des 3 rivières
The circuit starts in the town centre of La Nouaye, in the avenue called "allée du Calvaire". 
The hike lasts 3h30, on a distance of 15 km.
You have to follow the yellow marking to discover the surroundings of La Nouaye and Bédée. 
Le circuit de Blavon
The starting point is near the town hall of La Nouaye for a 9 km hike lasting approximately 2h15, following the yellow marking.
Passable path the whole year.

See also
Communes of the Ille-et-Vilaine department

References

External links

Mayors of Ille-et-Vilaine Association 

Communes of Ille-et-Vilaine